Wondalga is a rural community in the central east part of the Riverina and situated about  north of Batlow and  south of Adelong.

Middle Adelong Post Office opened on 1 August 1875, was renamed Wondalga in 1908 and closed in 1971.

References

External links

Towns in the Riverina
Towns in New South Wales
Snowy Valleys Council